Galway by-election, 1874 may refer to:

 Galway Borough by-election, March 1874
 Galway Borough by-election, June 1874